In the Name of God (stylized as In The Name Of GOD) is an Indian Telugu-language crime drama web series created by Ranga for Aha. It is written and directed by Vidyasaagar Muthukumar. The seven-episode series stars Priyadarshi Pulikonda, Nandini Rai and Posani Krishna Murali in primary roles. Produced by Suresh Krissna, the series premiered on Aha on 18 June 2021.

Synopsis

Cast 

 Priyadarshi Pulikonda as Aadi
 Nandini Rai as Meena
 Posani Krishna Murali as Ayyappa
 Mohammad Ali Baig as Rossi
 Rajsekhar Aningi
 Vikas as Thomas
Chandrakanth Dutta
Uma Maheswara Rao
Riyaz
Deviyani Sharma
Anil Kumar
Gautam Kumar
Krishna Kumar Vanjari
Aroul D. Shankar
Sai Priyanka Ruth
Jane Thompson
Sakhshi Sri

Episodes

Production 
Muthukumar first narrated the story to Suresh Krissna, along with Ranga in 2018. He then started writing the story of the series and ended in 2020, due to the delay because of COVID-19 pandemic in India. After watching Priyadarshi's performance in Mallesham (2019), he chose him for the Aadi role. Similarly, Ali Baiga was cast due to his performance in the Tamil film Aruvi (2016). Filming was done in 2020 and 2021. Most of the scenes were shot in Maredumilli, Rajahmundry and Amalapuram of Andhra Pradesh. Vijaythenarasu and Subhash were signed as art directors of the series.

Soundtrack

Release 
The premiere of the series was announced on 18 May 2021. On 12 June 2021, it was announced that the series will be premiered on 18 June 2021.

Reception 
Sravan Vanaparthy of The Times of India stated "Despite being a bold attempt, truth remains that ING is a long way off from many shows in its genre." Writing for Cinema Express, Ram Venkat Srikar gave a rating of 1.5 stars out of 5 and said that "While it’s good to see every major character get an arc, the endings are consistently blatant. As we navigate questions with uninspiring answers, the series ends on a poor excuse of a twist."

Film Companion's Karthik Keramulu quoted "In The Name Of God is a tedious merry-go-tound of a crime thriller"

References

External links 

 
 In The Name of GOD on Aha

Telugu-language web series
2021 web series debuts
2021 web series endings
Crime web series
Indian drama web series
Aha (streaming service) original programming
Television shows set in Andhra Pradesh